Roy Gardner may refer to:

Roy Gardner (bank robber) (1884–1940), American bank robber
Roy Gardner (businessman) (born 1945), former chairman of Manchester United F.C. (2003–2005), former chairman of Plymouth Argyle F.C.
Roy Gardner (cricketer) (1914–2004), Australian cricketer